Rumpole and the Angel of Death is a 1995 collection of short stories by John Mortimer about defence barrister Horace Rumpole. They were adapted from his scripts for the TV series of the same name.
The stories were:
"Hilda's Story"
"Rumpole and the Angel of Death"
"Rumpole and the Little Boy Lost"
"Rumpole and the Model Prisoner"
"Rumpole and the Rights of Man"
"Rumpole and the Way Through the Woods"

References

Works by John Mortimer
1995 short story collections